Twan van Gendt (born 9 June 1992 in 's-Hertogenbosch) is a Dutch racing cyclist who represents the Netherlands in BMX. He was selected to represent the Netherlands at the 2012 Summer Olympics in the men's BMX event, where he placed 5th in the final. In June 2015, he competed in the inaugural European Games, for the Netherlands in cycling, more specifically, Men's BMX. He earned a silver medal.

Twan competed at the 2016 Summer Olympic Games in the men's BMX competition, where he placed 9th.

After the 2016 Olympic Games, Twan battled with a knee injury in 2017 and didn't compete for 5 months. He returned to competition in 2018 and became World Champion in 2019.

Twan is also a National Record holder in the Powerlifting discipline Deadlift in the weight category until 85 kg.

See also
 List of Dutch Olympic cyclists

References

External links
 
 
 

1992 births
Living people
BMX riders
Dutch male cyclists
Olympic cyclists of the Netherlands
Cyclists at the 2010 Summer Youth Olympics
Cyclists at the 2012 Summer Olympics
Cyclists at the 2016 Summer Olympics
Cyclists at the 2020 Summer Olympics
European Games silver medalists for the Netherlands
European Games medalists in cycling
Cyclists at the 2015 European Games
Sportspeople from 's-Hertogenbosch
Cyclists from North Brabant